Anchastus is a genus of beetles belonging to the family Elateridae.

The species of this genus are found in America, Southern Africa, Australia.

Species:
 Anchastus anthrax (Horn, 1871)

References

Elateridae
Elateridae genera